Lancaster is an English surname. Notable People with the surname include:

 Alan Lancaster (1949–2021), English bassist
 Amber Lancaster (born 1980), American actress and model
 Benjamin Lancaster (1801–1887), British pharmacist
 Bill Lancaster (aviator) (1898–1933), British aviator
 Bill Lancaster (1947–1997), American screenwriter
 Brett Lancaster, professional cyclist
 Burt Lancaster (1913–1994), American actor
 Callum Lancaster, English rugby league footballer
 Cameron Lancaster, English football player
 David Lancaster (disambiguation), multiple people
 Don Lancaster, American author and inventor
 Ernie Lancaster (1953–2014), American blues guitarist and songwriter
 Geoffrey Lancaster, Australian classical pianist and conductor  
 Harry Lancaster, American basketball and baseball coach
 Jack Lancaster, British Rally Driver 2020-
 James Lancaster, prominent Elizabethan trader and privateer in India
 Jason Lancaster, American musician 
 John L. Lancaster, a mathematical economist and professor of economics at Columbia University
 Joseph Lancaster (1778–1838), English Quaker and public education innovator
 Kelvin Lancaster (1924–1999), Australian economist
 Les Lancaster, professional baseball player in the Major Leagues 
 Mark Lancaster (disambiguation), multiple people
 Marshall Lancaster (born 1974), English actor
 Martin Lancaster (born 1943), American politician 
 Nancy Lancaster,  20th-century tastemaker and owner of a British decorating firm
 Osbert Lancaster (1908–1986), English cartoonist, author, art critic and stage designer
 Penny Lancaster (born 1971), English model 
 Robert S. Lancaster (1958–2019), American skeptic
 Ron Lancaster, football player, coach and general manager in the CFL
 Roy Lancaster, UK TV gardener, author and plant hunter
 Sarah Lancaster (born 1980), American actress
 Sophie Lancaster (1986–2007), British murder victim
 Spear Lancaster, American politician
 Stuart Lancaster (born 1969), rugby union coach
 Tyler Lancaster (born 1994), American football player
 William Lancaster, pseudonym for John Byrne Leicester Warren, 3rd Baron De Tabley, poet and author
 William Lancaster (anthropologist) (born 1938), British anthropologist
 William Lancaster (cricketer) (1873–1938), English cricketer
 William de Lancaster I (died c.1170), English nobleman
 

English-language surnames
English toponymic surnames